The A541 is an A road in North Wales. The road starts on the A525 in Trefnant, between St Asaph and Denbigh, and ends in Wrexham. On the way, it passes the town of Mold. It also passes through many villages. In northern-central Wrexham it joins the B5101 road.

The section of the road between Mold and Denbigh, centred on Rhydymwyn, was described by North Wales Police as the most dangerous road in North Wales.

References

Roads in Wrexham County Borough
Roads in Flintshire
Roads in Denbighshire